Shahrak-e Alam ol Hoda (also Romanized as Shahrak-e ‘Alam ol Hodá) is a village in Miyan Ab-e Shomali Rural District, in the Central District of Shushtar County, Khuzestan Province, Iran. At the 2006 census, its population was 3,108, in 555 families.

References 

Populated places in Shushtar County